The Pelagiidae are a family of jellyfish. Members of the family Pelagiidae have no ring canal, and the marginal tentacles arise from umbrella margin.

Genera
There are four genera currently recognized: 
Genus Chrysaora – (14 species)
Genus Mawia – Mawia benovici
Genus Pelagia – Pelagia noctiluca
Genus Sanderia – (2 species)

References

 
Cnidarian families
Semaeostomeae